Viktorin (Victorinus) Strigel (16 or 26 December 1524, Kaufbeuren — 26 June 1569, Heidelberg) was a Philippist Lutheran theologian and Protestant reformer.

Life

Victorinus Strigel was born 1524 in Kaufbeuren, the son of the physician Ivo Strigel. He attended the University of Freiburg in October 1542 and went to the University of Wittenberg to study philosophy and theology. There he became a follower of Philipp Melanchthon in 1544, earned a Master of Arts, and gave his own lectures. Due to the Schmalkaldic War, he fled with Melanchthon at first to Magdeburg and went to the University of Erfurt, where he also taught. From Erfurt, he was recommended to Jena, where he took part in the founding of the Gymnasium’s academicum and from 20 March gave lectures on philosophy, history, and later on Melanchthon's Loci Communes.

He then continued his academic career as a professor and rector of the University of Jena. He supported the establishment of the university constitution. Strigel taught students in Jena in the abandoned Dominican monastery; this was the setting of the emergence of the "Collegium Jenense." With the appointment of Matthias Flacius 1557 Strigel entered into the dispute between the Gnesio-Lutherans and the Philippists, who tended toward the more mediating position of the followers of Melanchthon. In 1559 he was even taken into custody because of his theological views and suspended from duty. In 1562 he moved to the University of Leipzig to take a post, from there to Wittenberg, and finally to the University of Heidelberg in 1567, where he accepted the Reformed teaching of the Eucharist.

Selected works
 Loci theologici 1581-84) Neustadt/Haardt
 Epistolae . . .  de negocio Eucharistico scriptae ad amicos (1584) Neustadt/Haardt
 Epitome doctrinae de primo motu (1564) Leipzig

Further reading

 
 
 Johann Jakob Günter and Johannes Günther, Lebenskizzen der Professoren der Universität Jena seit 1558- bis 1858. Jena: Friedrich Mancke Verlag, 1858.
 Wolfgang Klose, Das Wittenberger Gelehrtenstammbuch: das Stammbuch von Abraham Ulrich (1549–1577) und David Ulrich (1580–1623). Halle: Mitteldt. Verlag, 1999, 
 William R. Russell, (1996) "Viktorin Strigel" in The Oxford Encyclopedia of the Reformation vol 4, 119-20.

External links
   Works of Strigel available at the Munich Digitisation Centre (MDZ)

1524 births
1569 deaths
German Lutheran theologians
Philippists
Christian Kabbalists
German Protestant Reformers
University of Wittenberg alumni
Academic staff of the University of Jena
Academic staff of Leipzig University
Academic staff of Heidelberg University
16th-century German Protestant theologians
German male non-fiction writers
16th-century German male writers
16th-century Lutheran theologians